The 1897–98 season was Burslem Port Vale's second season of football (fourth overall) in the Midland League. Their league form proved streaky, as they lost seven of their opening nine fixtures but recovered to post nine wins in 12 games from November to March, ending the campaign in fifth-place. However they proved their worth in the cup competitions, particularly so in the FA Cup, beating Small Heath and eventual Football League First Division champions Sheffield United en route to the second round. In the Birmingham Senior Cup they took First Division side West Bromwich Albion to a second replay, whilst they beat Stoke in the semi-finals of the Staffordshire Senior Cup, losing out to West Bromwich Albion in the final. Their success earned them re-election back into the Football League.

Overview

Midland League
Burslem Port Vale retained the entire first team of the 1896–97 campaign and strengthened the squad by signing four Stoke players: former England international right-back Tommy Clare, right-half Lucien Boullemier, left-winger Billy Heames and left-half Ted McDonald. They unveiled a new kit of red and white striped tops with blue kickers. The season opened with an "exciting" 2–2 draw with Burton Wanderers; the attendance at the Athletic Ground was a healthy 2,000, though Clare had trouble with his boots and played most of the match wearing just one of them. Two away defeats followed, and young reserve Frank Mitchell was then installed at centre-forward and proved an instant success, scoring a hat-trick in a 4–0 home win over Kettering. However four league defeats later the players and directors met to discuss what was going wrong; the 1–0 defeat by Barnsley St Peter's was a particular calamity as goalkeeper Tom Poole  punched the ball into his own net from an indirect free-kick.

Four league defeats were followed by four straight league wins, including a double over third-placed Rushden. They then slipped to a 4–1 boxing day defeat at Kettering, but recovered to beat Doncaster Rovers 4–0 to head into second-place on 3 January. This started a run of five wins and two draws from seven games, with Clare being credited for inspiring the players "with a confidence never before approached". However they finished the campaign with two away defeats, ending up in fifth-place with 23 points from 22 games. Danny Simpson finished with a tally of nine league goals, indicating that the club could benefit from a consistent goalscorer at centre-forward. Nevertheless, the club's exploits in the FA Cup saw them achieve 18 votes in their successful application to rejoin the Football League.

Cup competitions
Vale found great success in the FA Cup, beating Football League Second Division side Small Heath 2–1 in the third qualification round thanks to a brace from Clare; Small Heath had originally proposed to switch the venue to Muntz Street for a £100 payment, but were refused. After a walkover victory against Kidderminster, they were fired by a "special inducement" and played "with dash and skill" to eliminate Burton Wanderers 2–1 to reach the first round proper. Eventual Football League First Division champions Sheffield United were expecting to romp to victory at Bramall Lane, but the Vale team were in confident mood and held out for a 1–1 draw, the home side only staying in the tie due to a dubious penalty. Vale rejected an offer of £250 to play the replay at Bramall Lane, and went on to win the tie 2–1; Dick Evans gave Vale a two minute lead before United equalised with a rush goal eight minutes from time. In extra-time, United goalkeeper William Foulke "acted in an idiotic manner" and was caught out of position as Vale's Billy Heames broke away, running half the length of the pitch before pulling the ball back for Lucien Boullemier to score the winning goal. Vale claimed earnings of £350 for the fixture as a crowd of 15,000 witnessed the giantkilling; the Burslem school board gave schoolchildren a special holiday so they could attend the game. Second Division leaders Burnley awaited in the second round, but Vale were below par as they slipped to a 3–0 defeat at Turf Moor.

Vale were pitted against high-flying First Division club West Bromwich Albion in the first round of the Birmingham Senior Cup and after two 0–0 draws were finally beaten 2–1 in the second replay. Vale confidently dispatched Burton Wanderers 5–0 in the first round of the Staffordshire Senior Cup. A 3–1 win over Potteries derby rivals Stoke in front of a home crowd of 7,000 took them into the final for the first time, where they again faced West Bromwich Albion, this time at the neutral venue of the Victoria Ground. A 8,500 crowd turned up, but West Brom denied Vale any silverware as they claimed a 2–1 victory.

Results
Burslem Port Vale's score comes first

Legend

Midland League

FA Cup

Birmingham Senior Cup

Staffordshire Senior Cup

Player statistics

Appearances

Top scorers

Transfers

Transfers in

Transfers out

References
Specific

General

Port Vale F.C. seasons
Burslem Port Vale